Joseph Shu-Wei Lin (born June 21, 1992) is a Taiwanese-American professional basketball player who plays for the New Taipei Kings of the P. League+.

Early life
Joseph Shu-Wei Lin was born in Palo Alto, California to Gie-ming Lin and Shirley Lin (née Xinxin Wu) on June 21, 1992. His brother Jeremy Lin was a professional basketball player in the NBA.

College career
Lin attended Hamilton College and played as a point guard on the Division III team. He was a respectable rotation guard that made the All-Conference Second Team in his senior year.

Professional career

Taipei Fubon Braves (2015–2022)
Lin then signed with Taiwan's Fubon Braves in 2015, for the 2015 SBL season. Lin was averaging 5 points and 2 assists and would get into foul trouble and not really play for the whole first half. Instead of giving up and giving in, Lin fought through the obstacles and proved that he belonged at the pro level. He was named the SBL 2015-2016 Rookie of the Year, became the first rookie ever to be named to the All-SBL first team. He averaged 12.1 points, 4.1 rebounds and 4.4 assists per game.

In the 2018–2019 season, Lin won his first ever SBL Championship. Lin was second in scoring among local players (13.4 points per game) and fourth in assists (4.9 assists per game) during the regular season. He went on to average 14.3 points, 2.8 rebounds, and 5.3 assists in the finals.

Upon the unveiling of the Braves as the tenth team to join the ABL in the 2019–2020 season, Lin expressed his excitement to join the league.

In a heartfelt Instagram post on August 7,2022, Lin expressed his gratitude for the opportunity given to him by the Fubon Braves. Lin stated that he would not return for an 8th season.

New Taipei Kings (2022–Present)

On August 12, 2022, Lin joined the New Taipei Kings.

Career statistics

ABL

|-
| align=left | 2019–20
| align=left | Taiwan
| || || || || || || || || || ||

Personal life
Lin has two older brothers, Jeremy and Joshua. Jeremy Lin, an NBA star, currently plays with him in the P. League+ for the Kaohsiung Steelers. Dr. Joshua Lin studied dentistry at New York University.

Lin acquired a Taiwan passport in July 2020.

References

1992 births
Living people
American emigrants to Taiwan
American evangelicals
American expatriate basketball people in Taiwan
American sportspeople of Chinese descent
American sportspeople of Taiwanese descent
Basketball players from California
Point guards
Sportspeople from Palo Alto, California
Taiwanese men's basketball players
Fubon Braves players
Taipei Fubon Braves players
Super Basketball League players
ASEAN Basketball League players
P. League+ players